Vipul class of barges are a series of five self-propelled water carrier watercraft being built by Vipul shipyard, Surat for the Indian Navy.

Description
Each vessel in the series is operated by a crew of 20. They are fitted with two engines and are capable of speed up to 12 knots. They have a capacity to carry 500 tonnes of fresh water. They are intended to serve warships at anchorage outside the harbour and elsewhere to ensure quick operational turnaround. They are being built at Magdalla port in Surat as per contract concluded in February 2006.

Specifications
Gross weight: 598 tonnes
Net weight: 179 tonnes
Dead weight: 604.85 tonnes
Displacement: 1042.634 tonnes
Light weight: 437.784 tonnes
Overall length: 50.2 meters
Lbp: 46.8 meters
Brdth Mlt: 11 meters
Draught (max): 2.9 meters
Depth Mld: 3.8 meters
Engine: Caterpillar
Power: 1342 kW
Auxiliary generator: 1 x 36 kW, 2 x 86 kW 415 V 50 Hx AC
Speed: 12 knots

References

External links

Auxiliary ships of the Indian Navy
Ships of the Indian Navy
Auxiliary barge classes